Diviaky nad Nitrou is a village and municipality in Prievidza District in the Trenčín Region of western Slovakia.

History
In historical records the village was first mentioned in 1210.

Geography
The municipality lies at an altitude of 304 metres and covers an area of 19.859 km². It has a population of about 1798 people.

Genealogical resources

The records for genealogical research are available at the state archive "Statny Archiv in Nitra, Slovakia"
 Roman Catholic church records (births/marriages/deaths): 1696-1896 (parish A)

See also
 List of municipalities and towns in Slovakia

References

External links

 
https://web.archive.org/web/20071116010355/http://www.statistics.sk/mosmis/eng/run.html
Surnames of living people in Diviaky nad Nitricou

Villages and municipalities in Prievidza District